Tracy is an unincorporated community in Union Township, LaPorte County, Indiana.

History
Tracy (formerly called Tracy Station) contained a post office from 1879 until 1912. The community was named for a railroad employee. The Tracy station was located on the Baltimore and Ohio Railroad.

Geography

References

Unincorporated communities in LaPorte County, Indiana
Unincorporated communities in Indiana